Vanessa Rare is a New Zealand film and television actress, screenwriter and director. She is of Ngāti Pu, Ngāti Porou, Ngāti Pukenga and Ngāpuhi iwi descent.

Career 

Rare's screen debut was as Rata in the 1990 comedy film Ruby and Rata. She has acted in a number of movies, as well as holding an extended role on the shop opera Shortland Street as Te Hana Hudson from 2001 to 2005.

In the 1990s Rare studied literature and television and film studies at the University of Auckland and began to write and direct television series and short films.

Recognition 

In 2003 Rare was nominated for Best Script, Single Episode of a Drama Series or Serial for Mataku at the New Zealand Television Awards. In 2014 she was nominated for Best Supporting Actress for The Z-Nail Gang at the New Zealand Film Awards.

Filmography

References

External links 

Living people
Year of birth missing (living people)
New Zealand television actresses
New Zealand film actresses
New Zealand film directors
New Zealand screenwriters
New Zealand women screenwriters
University of Auckland alumni
New Zealand soap opera actresses
20th-century New Zealand actresses
21st-century New Zealand actresses
Ngāti Porou people
Ngāpuhi people
Ngāti Pūkenga people